Sason maculatum is a species of spider in the family Barychelidae, found in the Mariana Islands and the Caroline Islands.

References

Barychelidae
Spiders of Asia
Spiders described in 1963